McCamley, MacCamley, MacAmley, Macamley and McAmley are all synonyms of the name MacAuley in the Irish counties of Antrim and Armagh. The most common being McCamley. Notable people with the surname include:

Bill McCamley (born 1978), American politician
Graham McCamley, Australian cattle baron
Douglas James McCamley ( born 1968) American Musician, vocalist for Mudd Bucket

References

Surnames of Irish origin